Ana Subotić (born 18 November 1983) is a Serbian long-distance runner.

Career
She is the 2010 and 2011 winner of the Podgorica Marathon, 2011 national champion in 5000 m, 10,000 m and 3000 m Steeplechase. Ana won 7 medals at the Balkan Athletics Championships.

At the 2012 Rotterdam Marathon, she ran her personal best, 2:36:14, qualifying for the 2012 Summer Olympics.

Personal bests

Achievements

References

External links

 
 
 
 

1983 births
Sportspeople from Valjevo
Living people
Serbian female marathon runners
Serbian female steeplechase runners
Serbian female long-distance runners
Olympic athletes of Serbia
Athletes (track and field) at the 2012 Summer Olympics
21st-century Serbian women